Nora Anne Dowd Eisenhower (née Dowd; born December, 1953), daughter to Thomas F. and Anne M. (Ruskan) Dowd, is a public administrator who specializes in issues of aging. 
Since 2013, she has been Assistant Director for the Office of Older Americans at the U.S. Consumer Financial Protection Bureau. She was Secretary of the Pennsylvania Department of Aging from 2002 to 2008. 
Between 2011 and 2013 she was affiliated with the National Council on Aging where she was the Director of the National Center for Benefits Outreach and Enrollment, then the Senior Vice President of Economic Security. Earlier, from 2000 to 2002, she served as the AARP state director for Pennsylvania.

Eisenhower attended Sachem High School, Long Island, NY, 1968–1972. She received her bachelor's degree from State University of New York at Stony Brook in 1979.
After earning her J.D. degree from Antioch University in 1982, she was a staff attorney at the Federal Trade Commission in Washington, D.C., where she prosecuted telemarketing fraud and other cases of consumer fraud. She later served for six years as Pennsylvania Deputy Attorney General in the Bureau of Consumer Protection. She is married to Jim Eisenhower. They have two children.

References

Living people
State cabinet secretaries of Pennsylvania
People of the Consumer Financial Protection Bureau
1953 births
Antioch University alumni
Stony Brook University alumni